The Statpipe pipeline is a natural gas system, which links northern North Sea gas fields with the Norway's gas export system.  It transports gas from Statfjord, Gullfaks, Heimdal, Veslefrikk, Snorre, Brage and Tordis gas fields.

History
The Statpipe was developed by Statoil.  The development plan was approved by the Norwegian Parliament (Storting) on 10 June 1981. The rich gas pipeline from Statfjord became operational on 25 March 1985 and the dry gas pipeline from Kårstø to Ekofisk field came on stream on 15 October 1985. The Draupner S riser platform was installed in 1984 as part of the Statpipe system. In 1998, the Statpipe was connected directly with the Norpipe. On 1 January 2003, the Statpipe was merged into Gassled partnership and Gassco became the operator of the pipeline.

Technical features
It consists of both rich and dry gas pipelines. It has branch lines from Snorre and Gulfaks fields.

The first leg of the dry gas pipeline runs from Kårstø to the Draupner S riser platform in the North Sea. The Draupner S riser platform ties the Statpipe lines from Heimdal and Kårstø together for onward transmission to Ekofisk.

In summary the pipelines are as follows.

The details of the Statpipe riser platforms are as follows.

Ownership
The pipeline is owned by Gassled, operated by Gassco, and the technical service provider is Statoil.

References

External links

 Statpipe rich gas (Gassco website)
 Statpipe dry gas (Gassco website)
 Statpipe (Statoil website)

Energy infrastructure completed in 1985
Natural gas pipelines in Norway
North Sea energy
Pipelines under the North Sea
1985 establishments in Norway